Michael S. Higgins (born February 17, 1967) is an American retired professional basketball player.

A 6'9" power forward born in Grand Island, Nebraska and from the University of Northern Colorado, Higgins played two seasons (1989–1991) in the National Basketball Association (NBA) as a member of the Los Angeles Lakers, Denver Nuggets, and Sacramento Kings. He averaged 1.7 points per game in his NBA career. He later joined Obradoiro CAB.

Higgins also played several seasons in the Continental Basketball Association (CBA), for the Rapid City Thrillers, Yakima Sun Kings, Omaha Racers and Grand Rapids Hoops.

Notes

1967 births
Living people
Akita Isuzu/Isuzu Motors Lynx/Giga Cats players
American expatriate basketball people in Argentina
American expatriate basketball people in Brazil
American expatriate basketball people in France
American expatriate basketball people in Italy
American expatriate basketball people in Japan
American expatriate basketball people in Spain
American men's basketball players
Baloncesto León players
Basket Zaragoza players
Basketball players from Nebraska
BCM Gravelines players
Bilbao Basket players
Boca Juniors basketball players
CB Girona players
CB Granada players
Denver Nuggets players
Estudiantes de Bahía Blanca basketball players
Franca Basquetebol Clube players
Grand Rapids Hoops players
Liga ACB players
Los Angeles Lakers players
Northern Colorado Bears men's basketball players
Obradoiro CAB players
Omaha Racers players
Peñarol de Mar del Plata basketball players
People from Grand Island, Nebraska
Power forwards (basketball)
Rapid City Thrillers players
Sacramento Kings players
Undrafted National Basketball Association players
Yakima Sun Kings players